A nail salon or nail bar is a specialty beauty salon establishment that primarily offers nail care services such as manicures, pedicures, and nail enhancements. Often, nail salons also offer skin care services. Manicures are also offered by general beauty salons, spas, and hotels. People who work at nail salons are usually called nail stylists, nailists or manicurists.

Nail salons offer a variety of options for nail care, examples of which include acrylics, silk or fiberglass wraps, French manicures, polish, and pedicures. Some nail salons offer one-stop beauty services. In addition to nail services, one-stop nail salons offer facial treatments, waxing, and skin care.

Generally, those working in nail salons are referred to as nail stylists. In some areas throughout the United States, nail stylist must hold formal, state-recognized qualifications in order to be able to work at nail salons. Certifications must come from state board.

Nail care services 

Nail salons offer the following services:

 Manicures
 Pedicures
 Acrylic overlays and extensions
 UV gel overlays and extensions
 Dip powder nails
 SNS nails
 Silk/fibreglass overlays and extensions
 Nail design
 Nail art
 Shellac nails
 Eyelash extensions
 Eyebrow tinting

Wages and working conditions
Nail salon wages and working conditions in New York City, a major center for nail salons in North America, are poor. In May 2015, an investigation by the New York State Department of Labor, which had been tipped off by a New York Times investigation, had been productive but was incomplete.

Working conditions 
There is some evidence to suggest that nail salon workers are subjected to potentially unjust, hazardous working conditions. In surveys conducted on Vietnamese-American nail salon workers, many responses suggested that the work environment may cause negative health consequences. According to Standard 62-1989: Ventilation for Acceptable Indoor Quality of the American Society for Heating, Refrigeration, Air Conditioning Engineers, adequate supply of outdoor air should be about 20 cubic feet per minute per occupant. This necessitates multiple pathways for air to enter and exit the room. Such pathways include, but are not limited to, windows and doors. The study revealed that one-third of the surveyed nail salons had only one single door for ventilation with no secondary air pathway.

Due to the nature of salon work, many nail stylists are required to wear masks and gloves. Other surveys conducted on similar worker populations revealed that 90% of workers wore masks and 70% wore gloves to work.

Chemical exposures
Nail stylists use beauty products like nail polish, nail polish removers, artificial nails, adhesives, and disinfectants throughout the day. Compared to the average individual, they are exposed to the chemical ingredients the products contain on a much higher magnitude. Some of the more potent chemicals are toluene, formaldehyde, ethyl methacrylate (EMA), and dibutyl phthalate (DBP). 
Organizations and coalitions, such as the National Healthy Nail and Beauty Salon Alliance, address worker rights and exposure concerns faced by nail stylists. These movements provide platforms for conversation regarding occupational safety and health, which is a part of environmental justice.

Some solvents used, such as acetone and ethyl acetate, are very flammable and should not be used near any flame.

Relevant policies and regulations in the United States

State level
California Safe Cosmetics Act of 2005(SB484)
Enacted in 2005, this senate bill requires the full disclosure of all ingredients of products sold in California to the California Department of Health Services. In addition, if the substances are known to cause cancer or reproductive harm, the products will be subject to investigation by the Division of Environmental and Occupational Disease Control. 
California Proposition 65 (1986)
Enacted in 1986, this proposition requires the state of California to publish a list of chemicals known to cause cancer, birth defects, or other reproductive harm. All California businesses with ten or more employees must also provide "clear and reasonable" warning before exposing any individual to a chemical on the aforementioned list.

Federal level
Toxic Substances Control Act of 1976 (TSCA) (15 U.S.C § 2601)
Enacted in 1976, this federal act provides the Environmental Protection Agency(EPA) the authority to regulate certain chemical substances. Currently, cosmetics are excluded from regulation under the TSCA but there have been campaign efforts that hope to extend the EPA's regulatory jurisdiction to include cosmetics.

References 

Beauty salons
Nail care